Elsinoë pyri is a species of fungus in the family Elsinoaceae. It is a plant pathogen that grows on apple (Pyrus malus). First described scientifically by Nikolai Nikolaevich Woronichin in 1914 as a species of Plectodiscella, the fungus was transferred to the genus Elsinoë by American mycologist Anna Eliza Jenkins in 1932.

References

Elsinoë
Fungi described in 1914
Fungi of Europe
Fungi of North America